Aphanelytrum is a genus of South American plants in the grass family.

 Species

 Aphanelytrum peruvianum Sánchez Vega, P.M.Peterson, Soreng & Laegaard - Cajamarca Region in Peru
 Aphanelytrum procumbens Hack. - Bolivia, Peru, Ecuador, Colombia

See also 
 List of Poaceae genera

References 

Flora of South America
Poaceae genera
Pooideae
Taxa named by Eduard Hackel